Carmarthenshire is a large rural county in West Wales. It includes mix of upland and mountainous terrain and  fertile farmland. The western end of the Brecon Beacons National Park lies within the county. Across Carmarthenshire there are a total of 370 Scheduled monuments. That is too many to have on a single list page, so for convenience the list is divided into the 227 prehistoric sites and the 143 Roman, medieval and post-medieval sites (shown below). Included on this page are 29 sites from Roman period (most, but by no means all military, and predominantly in the north of the county), and 10 early medieval sites (all crosses or inscribed stones). There are 57 sites dating to post-Norman medieval times, including a remarkable collection of 8 castles and a further 25 castle mounds. The 47 varied post-medieval sites include clusters along the coastal area. Carmarthenshire is both a unitary authority and a historic county. Between 1974 and 1996 it was merged with Cardiganshire (now Ceredigion) and Pembrokeshire to form Dyfed.

All the pre-Roman sites are listed at List of Scheduled prehistoric Monuments in Carmarthenshire

Scheduled Ancient Monuments (SAMs) have statutory protection.  It is illegal to disturb the ground surface or any standing remains. The compilation of the list is undertaken by Cadw Welsh Historic Monuments, which is an executive agency of the National Assembly of Wales. The list of scheduled monuments below is supplied by Cadw with additional material from RCAHMW and Dyfed Archaeological Trust.

Scheduled Roman to modern Monuments in Carmarthenshire

See also
List of Cadw properties
List of castles in Wales
List of hill forts in Wales
Historic houses in Wales
List of monastic houses in Wales
List of museums in Wales
List of Roman villas in Wales

References
Coflein is the online database of RCAHMW: Royal Commission on the Ancient and Historical Monuments of Wales, DAT is the Dyfed Archaeological Trust, Cadw is the Welsh Historic Monuments Agency

Carmarthenshire
Buildings and structures in Carmarthenshire